Jim Chen is an American legal scholar known for his expertise in constitutional law.  He holds the Justin Smith Morrill Chair in Law  at Michigan State University College of Law.  From 2007 to 2012, he served as the dean of the University of Louisville Brandeis School of Law.

Education

Chen received his B.A. and M.A. from Emory University in 1987.  Following his studies at the University of Iceland as a Fulbright Scholar, he earned his J.D., magna cum laude, from Harvard Law School, where he was executive editor of the Harvard Law Review.

Chen is fluent in Taiwanese and French, among other languages.

Career 
After law school, Chen clerked for federal judge Michael Luttig on the U.S. Court of Appeals for the Fourth Circuit and for Justice Clarence Thomas of the U.S. Supreme Court.

Chen was a professor of law at the University of Minnesota Law School from 1993 to 2007.  While at Minnesota he taught in the areas of administrative law, agricultural law, constitutional law, economic regulation, environmental law, industrial policy, legislation and statutory interpretation, and natural resources law.  Chen was active in Minnesota's law journals as an editor of the Constitutional Commentary and of the Minnesota Journal of Law, Science & Technology, as well being as an advisor for the Theatre of the Relatively Talentless during its first four years.

In late 2006, Chen was named as the new dean of the Brandeis School of Law.  He served in that position until 2012 when he was appointed as Professor at Michigan State. Along with Frank H. Wu at Wayne State University Law School,  Harold Hongju Koh at Yale Law School, and Wallace Loh at the University of Washington School of Law, Chen is one of four Asian Americans who have held the post of dean at an American law school.

Chen is an elected member of the American Law Institute and has served since 2010 as a public member of the Administrative Conference of the United States.

Scholarship and teaching 
Chen teaches constitutional law, regulatory state, and upper-level electives such as agriculture law. He has taught law around the world, including at Heinrich Heine University of Düsseldorf in Düsseldorf, Germany, the University of Nantes in Nantes, France, and at Slovak University of Agriculture in Nitra, Slovakia.  He writes on the inter-relatedness of mathematics, complexity theory, linguistics, and behavior psychology at Jurisdynamics and manages Law Blog Central, a sister site to Jurisdynamics that also previews other law professor blogs.

Selected works

Articles

Books and book chapters

See also 
 List of law clerks of the Supreme Court of the United States (Seat 10)

References

External links
Professor Chen's published articles on various legal topics
Professor Chen's Blog, Jurisdynamics

Year of birth missing (living people)
Living people
Law clerks of the Supreme Court of the United States
Harvard Law School alumni
American legal scholars
University of Minnesota faculty
University of Minnesota Law School faculty
American people of Taiwanese descent
University of Louisville faculty
Emory University alumni
University of Iceland alumni
Academic staff of the University of Nantes
American academics of Chinese descent
Law clerks of J. Michael Luttig
Fulbright alumni